Alberto Delgado y Pérez (born March 11, 1978) is a Cuban retired footballer.

Club career
Before joining the Rapids in 2005, he played for Ciudad de la Habana of Cuba and was one of the most dangerous players on the Cuba national team.

Delgado scored a goal and added three assists in his year with Colorado. He wears Pérez on the back of his jersey to honor his mother.  He was released by the Rapids before the 2005 season, signing with Puerto Rico.

In 2008, he was loaned to Sevilla Bayamon in the Puerto Rico Soccer League and decided to stay with them instead of the Puerto Rico Islanders.

International career
He made his international debut for Cuba in 1998 and has earned a total of 22 caps, scoring 4 goals. He scored all of his goals in one game against Surinam, making him the only Cuban to score 4 in an official international match. His final international was a January 2002 CONCACAF Gold Cup match against South Korea.

Defection to the United States
Delgado defected from Cuba during that 2002 Gold Cup, together with cousin and future Colorado Rapids teammate Rey Ángel Martínez. He and Martínez ran away from their teammates halfway through breakfast, literally running for more than thirty minutes before finding a Spanish-speaking gas station attendant who then called a cab for them. Martínez made his way there shortly after that.

International goals
Scores and results list Cuba's goal tally first.

References

External links
 Player profile - Islanders club website
 Player profile - USLSoccer
 

1978 births
Living people
Sportspeople from Havana
Defecting Cuban footballers
Association football forwards
Cuban footballers
Cuba international footballers
2002 CONCACAF Gold Cup players
FC Ciudad de La Habana players
Colorado Rapids players
Puerto Rico Islanders players
Sevilla FC Puerto Rico players
Major League Soccer players
USL First Division players
Cuban expatriate footballers
Expatriate soccer players in the United States
Expatriate footballers in Puerto Rico
Cuban expatriate sportspeople in the United States
Cuban expatriate sportspeople in Puerto Rico